The Lima Challenger is a professional tennis tournament played on outdoor red clay courts. It is currently part of the Association of Tennis Professionals (ATP) Challenger Tour. It is held annually in Lima, Peru, since 2000.

Past finals

Singles

Doubles

References

External links
ITF search

 
ATP Challenger Tour
Challenger tennis tournaments
Clay court tennis tournaments
Recurring sporting events established in 2000
Tennis tournaments in Peru